Events from the year 1121 in Ireland.

Incumbents
High King of Ireland: Domnall Ua Lochlainn

Deaths
 Muireadhach Ua Flaithbheartaigh, King of Iar Connacht.